is a Japanese footballer for SC Sagamihara.

Career statistics
Updated to 23 February 2018.

References

External links

Profile at SC Sagamihara

1987 births
Living people
Ryutsu Keizai University alumni
Association football people from Saitama Prefecture
Japanese footballers
J2 League players
J3 League players
Mito HollyHock players
Thespakusatsu Gunma players
Zweigen Kanazawa players
SC Sagamihara players
Association football defenders